Syd van der Vyver (1 June 1920 – 20 August 1989 in Pennington) was a racing driver from South Africa, who won the South African Drivers Championship in 1960 and 1961.

Career
After starting his motor sport career in speedway, van der Vyver switched to cars in the early 1950s, participating in both circuit racing and hillclimbing. He found success quickly, and by the end of the decade had established himself as one of the top drivers in the country. As well as winning the national championship twice in the early 1960s, he performed well in Formula One races against the top drivers in the world in the well-attended Rand Grand Prix, Natal Grand Prix and South African Grand Prix, finishing in the top 10 in all three races in 1961.

He had entered the World Championship 1962 South African Grand Prix, but had to withdraw after rolling and seriously damaging his new Lotus 24 the previous week in the 1962 Natal Grand Prix. This was his only entry to a World Championship Grand Prix. With the car repaired, he raced and won again in local events, but did not compete again in Formula One. After this car was destroyed in a fire, van der Vyver retired from the sport.

Results

Complete Formula One World Championship results
(key)

Non-Championship Formula One results
(key)

References

South African racing drivers
Afrikaner people
South African people of Dutch descent
South African Formula One drivers
1920 births
1989 deaths